Siruvapuri Balasubramani temple is a 500-year old was built by Vijayanagar kings is located near Chennai in Thiruvallur, India. The temple's original name in government records was Chinnambedu.

Deities
The main deity of this temple is Sri Balasubramaniyar. The temple also houses Thiru Annamalaiyar and Thiru Unnamalai amman. Utsava Moorthy of Lord Muruga is Valli manalar in wedding posture along with Valli. Lord Muruga.

A statue of Arunagirinathar faces the temple sanctum. The saint-poet visited this temple several times and sang several Thiruppugazh songs. "Archanai Thiruppugazh" was sung in praise of Lord Muruga.

References

External
 

Hindu temples in Tiruvallur district
Murugan temples in Tamil Nadu